Avraham Chaim Naeh (3 May 1890 – 21 July 1954) was a Lubavitcher chassid and major posek (halachic authority) active during the first half of twentieth century. He is most famous for his works Ketzos ha-Shulchan, Piskei HaSiddur, Shi'urei Mikveh, and Shi'urei Torah (Measurements of the Torah), in which he converted biblical measurements into contemporary measurements. The work is of great practical significance, since much of Jewish law involves specific requirements of precise sizes and quantities.

Naeh was born in Hebron. His father, Rabbi Menachem Mendel Naeh, was the dean of the Magen Avos Yeshiva, founded by the Sdei Chemed. He studied in his youth at the Ohel Moshe Yeshiva, under Rabbi Yitzchak Yerucham Diskin. In 1912, Naeh published Chanoch LaNa'ar, a book containing laws for bar mitzvah boys.

When World War I broke out, the Ottoman authorities expelled people from Palestine who did not possess Turkish citizenship. Many of the dispossessed Jews found refuge in Alexandria, Egypt, where Naeh opened a yeshiva called "Yeshivat Eretz Yisrael". His yeshivah had 200 students who had been exiled from Jerusalem. In Alexandria, Naeh wrote Shenot Chaim, a special Kitzur Shulchan Aruch for Sephardic Jews. In 1918, he returned to Palestine and served as the personal secretary of the Edah HaChareidis, under Rabbi Yosef Chaim Sonnenfeld,. He published his most famous work Ketzos HaShulchan in 1926. In 1948, he founded the Vaad HaRabbanim of Agudas Yisrael and later helped found the haredi weekly newspapers, Kol Yisrael and HaModia.

References 

1890 births
1954 deaths
Chabad-Lubavitch rabbis
Hasidic rabbis in Israel
Rabbis in Hebron
Rabbis in Jerusalem
Hasidic rabbis in Mandatory Palestine
Hasidic rabbis in Ottoman Palestine
Exponents of Jewish law
Authors of books on Jewish law